Stillingia dichotoma is a species of flowering plant in the family Euphorbiaceae. It was described by Johannes Müller Argoviensis in 1863. It is native to Bahia and Rio de Janeiro, Brazil.

References

dichotoma
Plants described in 1863
Flora of Brazil
Taxa named by Johannes Müller Argoviensis